Abdelkader Laïfaoui (born 29 July 1981 in Hussein Dey, Algiers) is an Algerian international retired footballer. Mainly a central defender, he could also play as a right back.

An Algerian international since 2004, Laïfaoui was a member of the Algeria national team at the 2010 Africa Cup of Nations and the 2010 FIFA World Cup. He was also a member of the Algeria A' national team that finished fourth at the 2011 African Nations Championship in Sudan.

Club career
In December 2005, Laïfaoui was linked with a move to Tunisian side Club Africain. Despite traveling to Tunis and agreeing to personal terms with the club, CR Belouizdad refused to release the player and an agreement on a transfer fee could not be reached.

On 25 July 2011 Laïfaoui signed a two-year contract with USM Alger, joining them on a free transfer from ES Sétif. On 14 April 2012, in a league game against MC Saïda at Saïda's Stade 13 Avril 1958, Laïfaoui was stabbed by opposing fans who stormed the pitch at the end of the game. As a result of his injuries he had to receive stitches and spend the night in hospital.

Honours

Club
 Won the Algerian League once with ES Sétif in 2009
 Won the Arab Champions League twice with ES Sétif in 2007 and 2008
 Won the North African Cup of Champions once with ES Sétif in 2009
 Won the North African Super Cup once with ES Sétif in 2010
 Won the Algerian Cup twice
 Once with ES Sétif in 2010
 Once with USM Alger in 2013
 Won the North African Cup Winners Cup once with ES Sétif in 2010
 Finalist of the CAF Confederation Cup once with ES Sétif in 2009
 Won the UAFA Club Cup once with USM Alger in 2012–13
 Won the Algerian Super Cup once with USM Alger in 2013
 Won the Ligue 1 once with USM Alger in 2013–14

Country
 Has 7 caps for the Algerian National Team
 Semi-finalist of the 2010 African Cup of Nations
 Played at the 2010 FIFA World Cup

References

External links
 
 
 

1981 births
2010 FIFA World Cup players
2010 Africa Cup of Nations players
2011 African Nations Championship players
Living people
People from Hussein Dey (commune)
Algerian footballers
Algeria international footballers
NA Hussein Dey players
ES Sétif players
Algeria A' international footballers
Algeria youth international footballers
Algeria under-23 international footballers
Algerian Ligue Professionnelle 1 players
CR Belouizdad players
OMR El Annasser players
USM Alger players
USM Blida players
Association football defenders
Competitors at the 2001 Mediterranean Games
Mediterranean Games competitors for Algeria
21st-century Algerian people